The 4th Region or the Northern Fleet is the flotilla of the Islamic Republic of Iran Navy in the Caspian Sea.

History

18th century 

The Persian fleet in the Caspian Sea was revived in 1742 by Nader Shah of Afsharid dynasty. He saw the flotilla as an essential tool to secure maritime trade and defend coasts of his northern lands, where Turkmen pirates often attacked.

By 1745, the fleet included two frigates and four smaller vessels while more were under construction at the Persian shipyards. One of the ships had a capacity of twenty canons and reportedly was more capable than Russian ships. Englishman John "Jamal Beig" Elton supervised the shipyard located in Anzali, as well as additional facilities in Lahijan and Langarud. Moscow was unhappy with the fleet, and subsequently tried to counter Persian influence in the sea. Following the death of Nader Shah, the Russians took the opportunity of anarchy to burn down the fleet in 1751–1752 and the naval stores in Rasht.

19th century 

The Treaty of Gulistan (1813), deprived Iran from having a naval fleet in the Caspian Sea and Russia was granted with exclusive rights to operate the only naval forces in the sea, known as the Caspian Flotilla.

By the end of the 19th century, one royal yacht –"a small dilapidated paddle-wheel steamer" named Nasereddin– was the only asset of the Persian navy in the Caspian Sea.

20th century 

In 1904, Iranians began construction of Anzali's port that was completed in 1913.

Prior to and during the World War I, Iran had no naval forces in the north. The Russian Navy blockaded Anzali in 1909 and relocated some 2,000 troops to Iran using the port city. The northern part of Iran remained under Russian military occupation and was placed under their wartime administration for some year to come. The Russians also controlled navigation in the sea. By March 1917, Russian forces were weakened and the region fell into British hands to prevent an Ottoman control. Afterwards, they created the British Caspian Flotilla.

The Russo-Persian Treaty of Friendship signed in 1921, eased Iranian efforts to reestablish its Caspian fleet once again, despite the fact the Soviets unilaterally assumed the authority for a preemptive attack on Iran in case they deemed Caspian security at stake, and Iranians promised to oust non-Iranians in their naval service in the event of harming Soviet interests.

Anzali became a military port, in addition to its commercial role, during reign of Reza Shah who reigned between 1925 and 1941. The city hosted Iran's naval academy and served as a naval base before World War II.

On 25 August 1941, Soviets launched a surprise attack on Iran and their seaplanes bombed Anzali and villages in the vicinity. A day later, Iran surrendered and all of the vessels in the fleet (except for the royal yacht) were seized.

In 1969, Iran moved one of its minesweepers in the Southern Fleet that was purchased from the United States in 1959 to the Caspian via Volga. As of 1970, the fleet included two 65-ton and two 45-ton gunships, as well as several boats and launches in addition to the minesweeper.

During the 1990s, Iran started rebuilding its fleet from scratch after declaring that it assumes the right to maintain military presence in the Caspian. An Iranian naval exercise was conducted in November 1995. In September 1998, Admiral Abbas Mohtaj stated "a stronger presence in the Caspian Sea is among the future programs of the Navy". The forces held another naval exercise, codenamed Mirza Kuchak Khan, in 1999.

Timeline of 21st century events 

 2001
 23 July: Iranian corvette  forced the vessel chartered by BP, which was going to work on Alborz/Araz offshore oil field (disputed between Iran and Republic of Azerbaijan), to leave the area.
 2002
 Iranian authorities announced that the naval forces will be deployed in the Caspian Sea whenever it is necessary to defend national interests.
 Iran tested missiles launched from cargo ships.
 1–15 August: Russia declined Iran's offer to participate with four warships in a large-scale naval wargame in August. It was held with presence of a fighter jet from Kazakhstan and one combat ship from Azerbaijan. Turkmenistan boycotted the wargame but Russia agreed to allow Iran to send observers.
 2003
 October: A new gunboat was launched.
 2007
 Russian naval group made a visit to Bandar Anzali.
 2008
 27 November:  was launched.
 2012
 August: Iran threatened to deploy  submarines to the Caspian Sea in response to Azerbaijani provocations.
 2013
 29 June–3 July: Marking the first voyage of Iranian navy in Volga, fast attack crafts  and  made a port call to Astrakhan.
 2015
 9–12 August: Russia ships Volgodonsk and Makhachkala, both s, visited Bandar Anzali and participated in joint drill with Iran.
 2016
 September: Iranian naval group visited Baku, Republic of Azerbaijan.
 2017
 March: Iranian vessels made a port call to Makhachkala on 9 March, on the fifth flag mission to Russia.
 April: Starting on 8 April, the first flag mission to Kazakhstan began.
 13–15 July: Russian corvette Makhachkala docked at Bandar Anzali (the fifth such mission).
 6–9 October: An Azerbaijani  harbored at Anzali in the first Azerbaijani navy visit to Iran.
 14 October:  and  left for a visit to Makhachkala (21 October).
 2019
 22–29 April:  and  went on a training mission and docked at Aktau, Kazakhstan.
 2020
 September: Iranian warships  and  took part in multinational exercise Caucasus 2020.

Units

Operational units 
 Naval Base at Anzali, Gilan
 Naval Base at Astara, Gilan
 Naval Base at Amirabad, Mazandaran
 4th Marine Brigade at Anzali, Gilan

Logistic units 
  Logistics base at Manjil, Gilan

Training centers 
 Naval University at Noshahr, Mazandaran
 Naval Training Centre at Rasht, Gilan
 Marine Training Centre at Manjil, Gilan

Commanders 
  Saifallah Anushiravani (1970s)
 Habibollah Sayyari (?)
 Afshin Rezayee Haddad (?–2017)
 Ahmadreza Bagheri (2017–2018)
 Abdolvahab Taheri (2018–present)

Current equipment 

Principal surface combatants in the fleet include:

Other notable vessels are in the fleet include an unknown number of  general-purpose patrol craft, and reportedly three surviving Sewart-class inshore patrol crafts (out of the nine acquired from the United States Coast Guard in 1953) namely Mahnavi Hamraz, Mahnavi Taheri and Mahnavi Vahedi. As of 2010, Iran was estimated to operate some 90 vessels, including auxiliary and small-sized units.

Assessment 
After Russia, Iran has the second largest fleet in the Caspian sea. Tehran has strengthened its fleet since the early 2000s. 

According to Paul A. Goble, with recent expansion of Iranian naval forces in the Caspian Sea, "Moscow will have to take this Iranian fleet into consideration as a potential challenge". James M. Dorsey states that Iranian growing presence is likely to boost rivalries among Caspian states.

References 

Islamic Republic of Iran Navy
Naval forces in the Caspian Sea